In 2021 Kent County Cricket Club competed in the 2021 County Championship, the 2021 One-Day Cup and the 2021 T20 Blast. The season was the fifth in charge for head coach, and former player, Matthew Walker. Sam Billings retained the club captaincy that he was first awarded in 2018. Daniel Bell-Drummond was named as vice-captain, replacing Joe Denly. Jack Leaning was named as captain for the One-Day Cup.

As a result of Brexit, the ECB confirmed that all Kolpak contracts would be terminated after the 2020 season. Counties were instead able to field two overseas players in all formats. Heino Kuhn, who had been contracted to Kent under a Kolpak deal, was, as a result, counted as an overseas player for this season.

On 18 September, during the T20 Blast Finals day at Edgbaston, Kent defeated Sussex in the semi-final. In the final, Kent defeated Somerset by 25 runs to win the tournament for a second time. This was the first trophy for the county since winning the 2007 Twenty20 Cup.

Squad

Departures
All-rounder Calum Haggett and bowler Ivan Thomas were both released by the club after their contracts expired at the end of the 2020 season.

On 20 May, 27-year-old left-arm spin bowler Imran Qayyum announced his retirement from all cricket due to a shoulder injury. On 20 July, bowler Tim Groenewald retired from professional cricket following ankle surgery in April.

Arrivals
In March 2021, Kent announced the signing of West Indian international fast bowler Miguel Cummins for the first eight matches of the County Championship. Zimbabwean born batsman Tawanda Muyeye, who qualifies as a domestic player having been educated at Eastbourne College, signed his first professional contract with the club on 31 March 2021. Muyeye was voted the Young Wisden Schools Cricketer of the Year in the 2020 edition of the almanack.

On 20 April, Kent announced the signing of former Pakistan international fast bowler Mohammad Amir for the second half of the T20 Blast. On 8 June, however, it was confirmed that Amir would be unable to join up with the squad due to rescheduling of the Pakistan Super League and COVID-19-related travel restrictions. New Zealand bowler Adam Milne was announced as a replacement for Amir, with Milne returning for a fourth spell with the county.

On 5 May, following a number of injuries to bowlers, Kent announced the loan signing of New Zealand-born Matt Quinn from Essex for their next four Championship matches. On 16 June, Quinn signed a three-year contract to join the county from 2022 and also rejoined on loan for the remainder of the 2021 season.

On 12 May, Kent announced the signing of Afghanistan leg spin bowler Qais Ahmad for the T20 Blast. On 9 June, Kent signed left-arm spin bowler James Logan on a short-term contract. Logan signed a two-year contract extension on 27 June.

After an unnamed played tested positive for COVID-19, all players who were in the squad for the T20 Blast match against Surrey on 9 July were forced to self-isolate. Kent called up a number of second team players and signed other homegrown players to join the remainder of the senior squad for a Championship game against Sussex; Joe Gordon, Harry Houillon, Dan Lincoln, Jas Singh and Bailey Wightman all made their first-class debuts, and Harry Finch played his first game for Kent against his former team. Kent signed three Scotland international players – Calum MacLeod, George Munsey and Safyaan Sharif – to strengthen the squad for the last two matches of the T20 Blast group stage. Elliot Hooper also made his Kent debut in the T20 Blast fixture against Middlesex, having previously played a single first-class game for Sussex. Munsey was also named in the squad for the One-Day Cup.

Squad list
 Ages given as of the first day of the County Championship, 8 April 2021.

The following second team players and short-term signings also featured in matches, but were not members of the long-term squad during the season: Harry Houillon, Calum MacLeod, Safyaan Sharif, Jas Singh, Elliot Hooper and Bailey Wightman.

County Championship
The County Championship returned in 2021 after the impact of the COVID-19 pandemic had forced its cancellation in 2020. The tournament was contested in a new format, replacing the two division structure. For the first phase of the tournament, teams were split into three groups of six. Kent were placed in Group 3 where they played ten matches against their opponents on a home and away basis. The top two teams from each group advanced to Division One for the second phase of the competition (where a further four matches will be played), with the other teams progressing to Divisions Two and Three. The team that finished top of Division One would be the county champions; the top two teams from Division One would then contest a five-day match at Lord's for the Bob Willis Trophy.

Group 3

Division 3

One-Day Cup
Due to the inaugural season of The Hundred being played at the same time, many of the top county cricketers were unavailable to play in the One-Day Cup. As well as several first-team players, Kent Head Coach Matt Walker was involved in The Hundred as Assistant Coach for the Oval Invincibles. Simon Cook took over as Interim Head Coach, Jack Leaning was named captain, and Ollie Robinson was named vice-captain for the tournament. Leaning was selected by the Trent Rockets as short-term cover for Steven Mullaney, meaning that he would miss games against Sussex and Essex, with Robinson taking over as captain.

Group A

T20 Blast

South Group

Play-offs

Quarter-final

Semi-final

Final

References

External links
Kent home at ESPN cricinfo
Kent County Cricket Club official site

2021
2021 in English cricket